Viewing may refer to:

 Remote viewing
 Social viewing
 Viewing (funeral), the part of funerals where family and friends see the deceased
 Wildlife viewing

See also
 Far sight (disambiguation)
 Public viewing area